John Henry Kenneth Pound (born 24 August 1944) is an English former professional footballer who played as a winger or inside forward for Portsmouth, Swansea City, Bournemouth and Gillingham between 1962 and 1971.

References

1944 births
Living people
English footballers
Footballers from Portsmouth
Association football wingers
Association football forwards
Gillingham F.C. players
Portsmouth F.C. players
Swansea City A.F.C. players
Yeovil Town F.C. players
AFC Bournemouth players
Weymouth F.C. players